Cole Thornhart is a fictional character from the American daytime dramas One Life to Live and General Hospital.

Casting
Cole was portrayed by Brandon Buddy from October 10, 2006, to November 10, 2010. In October 2011, it was announced that Buddy would return as Cole. However, he taped for only one day before leaving for undisclosed personal reasons. On November 1, 2011, it was announced that Van Hughes would take over the role of Cole. He played Cole from January 3, 2012, to January 13, 2012. On January 30, 2012, it was announced that Hughes would temporarily reprise his role of Cole to help usher in Alderson's Starr Manning to General Hospital.

When asked about the possibility of bringing back Cole or Hope to the new online reboot of One Life to Live, executive producer Jennifer Pepperman had the following to say:
"I was really shocked as a viewer when Cole and Hope were killed and I know on soap operas people say you can bring people back from the dead, but that is something that I feel strongly, and Prospect Park feels strongly about, and that is not bringing people back from the dead.  That is one of the things that never really feels right, but I am afraid that ABC killed Cole and Hope, and also Victor Jr. III (Tea and Victor Jr. son) and those are real losses for the show."

Backstory
Cole Thornhart was born off-screen to Patrick Thornhart and Marty Saybrooke. Patrick and Marty lived in Ireland briefly with newborn Cole before relocating to San Diego. However, on Christmas 2005, Patrick was purportedly killed. Marty decided to move back to Llanview with Cole in September 2006.

Storylines

2006–08
Cole was first seen at a party that Starr Manning and her friend Langston Wilde attended after being invited by some boys. When several boys at the party wanted to get too intense with the girls, Cole stepped in and did so later when they received taunts from their enemy, Britney Jennings. Starr and Cole started to get closer, attending a dance together and sharing their first kiss. In November 2006, Cole had a steroid-induced outburst towards Starr, much to the thanks of Britney and football player Gabe, when they started to make out in a bedroom following a football after-party. Cole wanted to go further, but Starr did not. As a result, Cole completely lost it and began to trash the room. In this process, he ripped the front of Starr's shirt, by accident. The fight continued out into the kitchen, where Cole proceeded to get angry at many other people. When Starr just wanted to go home, Britney wouldn't allow it and called the police, pretending to be Starr. When the police showed up at her home and wanted to question her about the events that took place, Starr hesitantly agreed. As the police questioned her, Cole and his mother arrived at the police station. Everyone was surprised when they realized who Cole's mother was, Marty Saybrooke.

In December 2006, Starr decided to forgive Cole. She apologized for her father's past actions towards his mother. Cole assures Starr that it was not her fault and that she couldn't have done anything to prevent the situation from occurring. Starr got into a fight with Langston, as she was continuously bad-mouthing Cole and his behavior. Langston accused Starr of still having strong feelings for him, with Cole overhearing the conversation. Starr reassured Cole, saying that he shouldn't believe Langston and all she has said about him. Cole disagreed, claiming that Langston was acting as a true friend by stating the obvious. Cole decided it was best to end their friendship, with Starr wondering if he cared about what she wanted.

In early January 2007, Britney Jennings decided to take extreme measures to do anything in her power to hook-up with Cole. She knew that with Starr having feelings towards him, it only made the challenge more intriguing. Britney then discussed her feelings and emotions with Cole, as she explained how she supposedly understood Starr's situation. She then stated that she has had her own share of difficulties, as her parents were struggling with their long-time marriage. All were buying into the dramatic sob story, except for Langston, whom knew the truth. Cole generously gave Britney a shoulder to cry on, letting her hug him for support.

As Starr reached the school, she witnessed Cole and Britney getting fairly close. Langston stated, that although Cole wasn't her favorite person, it would be harsh to see Britney steal away the guy that Starr likes. Starr then agreed, as she said that she'd do anything in order to not lose Cole. While waiting for Cole's presence nearby, Britney rushed up to Starr in the hall, presenting her with the card that she had created, out of the "goodness" of her heart. Surprised, Starr received the card and thanked her for it. Noticing that Cole was by his locker, Britney eagerly tried to steal all the attention away from Starr, creating a conversation with him, in order to make Starr jealous. Annoyed, Starr sarcastically excused herself while pushing Britney out of the way. Starr then came onto Cole and began making-out with him in front of all.

After the kiss, Cole and Starr fled away from the high school. They decided to run to the nearby park and discuss what happened back at school. Cole claimed that he wasn't quite sure why Starr suddenly jumped him like that in public. Starr then reacted, by stating that no one was around now, as she then kissed him once more. Cole then claimed that though it was nice and he liked it, it didn't seem like Starr was acting as her normal self. Cole questioned her for acting the way she did, though Starr would not answer. Embarrassed, Starr walked away trying to forget what had just happened moments ago. She second-guessed what had happened in the hall that day and kept on apologizing. As she tried to walk away, Cole stopped her, asking for the true reason she's acting in such a matter. Hesitantly, Starr claimed that it was because of Britney and how she was trying to steal him away from her. Cole smirked, then explained how Starr never had to change, in order to grab his attention. He then stated that Starr was the type of girl who never cared about Britney and that she was better than that.

When Britney officially found out the two were a couple and made it her mission to break them up. Marcie McBain, a teacher of Starr's tried to separate both of them, stating that it was the best thing. Starr and Cole wanted to see each other without all the drama involving Britney and Mrs. McBain, so they 'staged' a fake break-up. After the "break-up" Langston told Starr none of it was believable... as Britney still had other plans to make their lives miserable. They continued to see each other.

When the McBains asked Starr to babysit Tommy on the night Nelly Furtado was performing at Capricorn, Starr happily agreed. Michael hesitated, wondering if it were right to leave Starr alone with Tommy for a few hours, but eventually gave in. When Marcie and Michael left, Starr then sent a text message to Cole, asking him to come over. When Cole arrived at the apartment, Starr was quite impressed with his ability to interact with Tommy so well. Cole began reciting poems, in which his father used to read to him before he went to sleep. Surprisingly, Cole's poems worked and Tommy fell asleep. In order to pass the time by, Starr and Cole decided to watch a movie. Halfway through the movie, things began to slowly heat up; Cole started leaning in closer towards Starr, though she wasn't quite sure how to react. As he continuously approached her, Starr noticed what Cole was trying to do, slightly chuckling before leaning in for a soft kiss.

Within a matter of time, the delicate kiss turned into make-out madness between the two. As they kept making out, all was going well— until the phone rang. Without hesitating, Starr pushed Cole off her and ran for the phone. To her surprise, it was Marcie calling asking if Tommy was behaving. After finishing her conversation with Marcie, Starr began acting awkward towards Cole, who noticed that she wasn't her normal self and he asked her to take a seat on the couch beside him. Both silent, Starr and Cole avoided looking at each other. Cole then asked if they could discuss what had just happened in the living room. He questioned what would've happened if the phone hadn't have rung. He wondered if they would have gone further than just kissing.

While trying to get away from their parents and spend time together, Starr and Cole became stuck in the Llantano Mountain Lodge where they ended up sharing a room together. While they were in this room, Starr came to the decision that she was ready to go all the way with Cole. In the process of 'hooking up' Starr decided that she was not ready to go all the way and Cole understood, and they spent the night together. Starr and Cole were caught by Marty in the hotel room after Britney ratted them out via-cell phone. Marty found a condom that had been left by Cole and assumed the worst.

In late March, Starr and Cole had plans to run away together. In April, Starr broke up with Cole due to her father nearly choking Cole to death. Starr stated that it was for Cole's and Todd's safety. Britney tried to worm her way back into Cole's favor by signing up for the school play, which Cole already signed up for. After being miserable because of not being with his one true love, Cole reunited with Starr at the prom. After some convincing, he now has his mother's permission to date Starr. Blair, however, refused to allow Cole and Starr to be together.

Cole and Starr were finally happy after all the trouble of being broken up and they were finally together. Cole went in the storage and found out Miles Laurence was holding Todd there, drugged with a stab wound. Cole was going to go to the police to tell them that Miles has Todd locked up in storage, but Miles played the tape that was keeping Marty out of jail, and threatened Cole if he told the cops about where Todd is. However, Britney found out about Cole knowing about Todd's whereabouts. Cole was sick of keeping this secret so he told Marty about Miles keeping Todd in their storage room; Marty revealed to Cole that she killed Spencer Truman. Marty turned herself in for the murder, while Cole told Bo and John that Miles is the one keeping Todd missing; Starr overheard the entire reveal and became upset with him. Cole went to see Starr to plead his case and she wouldn't hear it. Starr told Cole that it was the end of them and that she hated Cole for lying and keeping the whereabouts of her father in secret.

Starr later forgave Cole for lying and they made up. Todd told Cole that he would never like him, but if he didn't tolerate him Starr would hate him forever, which led to them having a common understanding of each other. Marty was finally released from prison when it was revealed that it was actually Lindsay Rappaport who has murdered Truman.

In November, Cole gets kidnapped as John, Todd, Blair, and Marty go looking for Marcie and Todd's son. After Marty and John open up to each other and make love, she gets kidnapped and is found with her son in Ireland. After trying to escape John and Ramsey, a member of the FBI tried making a deal to get them home safely. Ramsey shoots the van's tires out and the van plummets over the edge of a cliff; Cole is thrown from the van and Marty is stuck inside. As John tries to free Marty, she forces him to find Cole because she is nothing without her son. As John saves Cole, the van explodes with Marty still held inside; she is later presumed dead. Cole and John then return to Llanview and Cole arrives at Starr's, who was ecstatic to see he is home and okay. Cole starts crying and tells Starr his mother is dead.

While walking alone, Cole wondered onto the docks where John and Ramsey were fighting. He overhears that Ramsey caused his mother's death. When Cole threatens to shoot Ramsey, Miles Laurence wonders onto the scene and is accidentally shot in the chest by Cole. After Miles falls into the water, Cole and Ramsey flee the scene. A panicked Cole rushes to Starr's house, fearing that he killed Miles. Cole escapes just as Ramsey arrived at the house and searched Starr's room. Cole ran off to Langston's old house to avoid being caught. The next day Starr goes to the house and meets up with Cole. Later he decides to confess to shooting Miles, much to Starr's disliking. Once at the hospital, Cole runs into John and tells him what he wants to do. John convinces him to leave and not say another word about it.

Cole and Langston attend group therapy together in January. They decide to surprise Starr with a sweet sixteen party. Starr jumps to conclusion that her best friend and her boyfriend are hooking up. She decides to confront them outside of UltraViolet, where she thinks they are attending a concert. She barges into the club and realizes it's a birthday party for her. She apologizes to Cole and Langston.

In March, Todd decides to move his family to Hawaii to keep his family safe from Ramsey's threats. Although Starr believes it's because he wants her and Cole to break up. Cole and Starr decide to sneak off to Langston's old house to spend one last night together. They decide they want to make love for the first time that night. Todd barges in and sees them in bed together and attempts to kill Cole.

A few weeks later, Starr finds out she's pregnant. She decides to keep the information from Cole, fearing for his safety. She runs off to Atlantic City to get an abortion. Meanwhile, Cole manages to get Langston to tell him where Starr is. Cole gets there in time and Starr decides not to get the abortion. Cole proposes they run away together so they can be family. They arrive in Virginia Beach and move into a motel. Later, they are found by Todd, Blair and John. Todd throws Starr down a flight of stairs, then beats up Cole until he is unconscious. They are rushed to the hospital, where John and Blair find out about Starr's pregnancy. They then return home. Starr tells Blair that she wants to have the baby but not take care of it. Replying she loves the baby and thinks that it should have more to offer then what she can give it. Blair tells her whatever she will support her with whatever choice she makes. On June 18, she tells Cole "That what is best for the baby is to have two parents that can love and take care of the baby. And that they are not ready to be parents. Cole, I'm giving the baby up for adoption after it's born." Cole is heartbroken saying that Starr really doesn't love him. Starr wants Marcie to have the baby after it is born though she declines though hinted that she may reconsider. In early July, Cole decided to tell Todd that Starr's pregnant, and planning on giving the baby to the McBain's. Cole thinks about suing Starr for custody of his child.

Cole decides to give up all his rights to his child. This leads to a breakup between them. When school starts up again, several boys make fun of Starr because of her pregnancy. Starr stands up for herself and Cole protects her telling the principal of the school, who wanted to kick her out, that if she kicks her out she better kick him out too, because he's the father of her baby.

Starr gives birth to their daughter but because of Bess Lord, they think that their daughter is dead due to RH disease but she is being raised as Chloe Brennan. Starr tells Cole that they are incompatible as she is RH negative and he is RH positive. She makes the analogy that there is 'bad blood' in the family.

2008–10
In the new year/late 2008, Cole goes through a hard time. Although he has his mother, she changed by being held captive by Todd. From the loving mother he loved to a wild-stricken woman in a way not wanting anything to do with him. Heartbroken Cole goes by his mother's new personality, breaking up with Starr and the death of his daughter Hope Manning-McBain turns to drugs. He said not to turn back to drugs but he does making him a drug addict. When Starr finds out she tries to help but he shuns her. He then gets into a car accident while driving himself and Matthew Buchanan home, while he was high. The car crashed into Gigi Morasco and Shane Morasco. Cole was sent to rehab after the car accident and managed to get clean with the help of Starr. Both Starr and Cole begin investigating the mysterious death of their baby. DNA results reveal that the lock of hair inside Starr's locket is not from their baby. The baby's headstone gives her name as Hope Manning McBain. Marcie later finds out that neither Cole nor Starr were RH positive, and that's what they said the baby died from. Natalie Buchanan and Jared Banks soon discover that Chloe who they think is Jessica's baby is Starr's baby. Maurice later tells Starr that Hope had to have died of something else because her and Cole are both RH negative. Starr and Cole are about to receive the baby from Jessica. When they get Hope back from Jessica/Bess, Starr struggles with the decision to give up Hope or keep her. Starr eventually gives the baby to Michael and Marcie, but is clearly heartbroken by her decision. Starr and Cole start their relationship back up. Marcie realizes how difficult the decision to give away Hope was for Starr, and on June 15, she offers Starr the opportunity to raise the baby. Starr tearfully accepts and Marcie gives Hope to Starr, saying that she loves them both. Her name is now Hope Manning-Thornhart. On June 17, Cole is at the loading dock and while being there, Asher offers Cole more drugs but Cole refuses. As Asher leaves, he puts the drugs in Cole's shirt pocket. Cole decides to get rid of them by throwing it into the river but before he does so he is caught by a cop and is arrested. He is brought to court and the judge decides to put Cole in prison for possibly two years. On June 18, he goes to Dorian's mansion where he discovers that Starr has decided to raise their infant daughter. As Cole is visiting he tells Starr about the incident and decides to propose to Starr, she later accepts his proposal. Although not happy with their decision, Todd and Blair both give their consent to the marriage. Just as the pastor is about to announce them married, John McBain walks in to inform Cole that he will not have to go to prison if he co-operates in a sting operation to bring down the school drug dealer, Asher. Starr and Cole call the wedding off, deciding to wait. The day before Cole is supposed to go undercover, Starr proposes that Cole spend the night with her. The two make love and the next morning Cole says goodbye to Starr and Hope.

He begins working undercover for the drug take down. John sets him up at an apartment, where Asher starts having their meetings. Asher introduces him to his boss, Serge. Starr and Cole accidentally meet up where Cole is doing his community service. Cole warns Starr not to say anything and that is when they fake an argument on when Cole can get money so Starr and Hope can move out. They share a passionate kiss and then Starr and Hope leave. Serge later makes a call to his boss. John and Bo continue working on Cole's undercover case. They begin buy receiving a tip that there is going to be a shipment that night coming into the docks. John realizes that the lord in the drug sales is Mayor Lowell. John then confides in Officer Oliver Fish about the undercover work. They then realize one of the officers is working for the Mayor.

Dorian Lord is now the Lowell's campaign manager and financial ad visor. While they are in the process of working on the campaign he stops by her mansion. Starr is downstairs and he begins criticizing how children should not have children. Starr is highly offended, but Dorian snaps a photo of the mayor holding Hope and Starr looking upset. Dorian prints it on the front page of her newspaper, The Sun.

Cole has a meeting with Serge and Asher. Since the drug shipment didn't arrive, Asher didn't have any drugs to sell to Justin Lowell, the mayor's son. Cole is forced to sell to Justin. Nobody realizes this but Todd Manning witnesses Cole selling the drugs. Todd takes a picture of the drug deal on his cell phone. Cole calls John and tells him that he had to sell to a teenager and give him a description of Justin. John later catches up with Justin and arrests him. Meanwhile, Todd goes to see Starr and tells her Cole is dealing drugs, using the picture as proof. In an attempt to keep her father from getting Cole into trouble, Starr is forced to reveal that he is working undercover with John. Dorian overhears their conversation from the foyer.

The undercover officer that had been working for Mayor Lowell gets a very descriptive phone call. He is to go and kill Cole. John McBain and Officer Fish hear the phone call off on the recorded tape. The police officer, Keaton, has already headed downstairs to the cell block. Before he gets the chance to kill Cole, John shoots him. Serge gets the news from spying at the police department and heads straight to Mayor Lowell. Meanwhile, John makes Brody hold Cole in his office with a loaded gun ready to shoot whenever necessary. While this is happening, Serge walks into La Boulaie and points a gun at Todd and Starr.

On November 25, Cole, Starr and Hope celebrate Thanksgiving as a family. Just before Starr's 18th birthday, Cole asks Starr if she and Hope will move in with him. After Starr and Blair convince Todd, she moves into Cole's apartment.

In March 2010, Cole was heartbroken to learn that Marty had lost her baby with John, and then turned angry when he found out Marty had been pushed, possibly by Todd. Hannah O'Connor shocks Cole with her claim that she actually saw Todd push Marty down the stairs. In the high school gym, Todd claims that Hannah is a liar when Cole confronts him. Cole, filled with outrage, beats up Todd in front of Blair, Starr, Tea, Danielle and others. Brody shows up to arrest Cole. Marty races to Cole's side when she finds out he was arrested.

Cole is released once again and goes to find Starr. He tries to avoid Hannah because she is the one that killed his mother's baby. Hannah said that Starr has moved on with James. Cole leaves town with Hannah to find Starr, this is a distraction that Hannah has used to keep him from discovering that she has Hope and Starr locked in her attic. Hannah takes every advantage of Cole's fragile state while Starr is gone. Eventually James finds Starr and Hope and Hannah tries to bury them alive, claiming she will still have Cole to herself. The police come upon them and Hannah is taken to jail.

Cole thinks that Elijah Clarke has killed Starr and Hope in the warehouse. He is unaware that they were actually being held by Hannah and were now safe with James. Cole shoots and kills Eli while he is handcuffed to a police car. Marty witnesses the shooting and makes Cole run while she takes the blame. Cole is later reunited with Starr and his daughter. Meanwhile, Marty is arrested for Eli's murder. While in custody, Natalie runs forensic evidence on the gun and discovers Cole's fingerprints along with Marty's. She shows the results to John who resolves to bring Cole in. Cole later decides to turn himself in and take responsibility for his actions. After hearing testimony from Tea Delgado and Nora, the judge decides to be lenient with Cole and sentences him to ten years in Statesville Prison. Before he is taken to prison, Cole breaks up with Starr, telling her not to wait for him and to live her life the fullest she can. Starr refuses to accept this and promises to wait. In February, Starr realizes that Cole was right and she needs to move on. In February 2011 Starr goes to see Cole. She breaks up with him but promises to continue to support him as a friend while he serves his sentence. On June 3, 2011 it is revealed that Cole's father Patrick is alive.

One Life to Live finale and General Hospital crossover
In January 2012, Cole breaks out of Statesville Prison and reunites with Starr and Hope. Cole and Starr walk in on Hannah holding a gun on Sam Manning. Hannah shoots at Starr, but Cole jumps in front of her and is shot instead. Cole survives the shooting, but fakes his death with the assistance of Todd Manning so he wouldn't have to go back to prison. After a brief reunion with his parents, he joins Starr and Hope in California.

Cole, Starr, and Hope later arrive in Port Charles in February after their flight to Llanview is redirected. Cole shares the history of the town with Starr, touching on the history of Luke and Laura and the Cassadines and then suggests that he and Starr get married. As Starr stalls concerning the marriage proposal, Anthony Zacchara crashes into their car after his tires are blown out by Johnny Zacchara. Starr is able to get out of the car, but Cole and Hope are still trapped inside when the car topples off a cliff. The car explodes, and Cole and Hope are presumed dead.

Notes and references

External links
Cole Thornhart profile - ABC.com
Cole Thornhart profile - SoapCentral.com

Thornhart, Cole
Thornhart, Cole
Television characters introduced in 2006
Fictional murderers
Fictional teenage parents
Male characters in television
Fictional criminals in soap operas